Dominic Thiem was the defending champion, but he did not participate that year.

Daniel Gimeno-Traver won the title, defeating Albert Ramos in the final, 6–3, 6–4.

Seeds

  Albert Ramos (final)
  Damir Džumhur (semifinals)
  Daniel Gimeno-Traver (champion)
  Aljaž Bedene (quarterfinals)
  Adrián Menéndez-Maceiras (first round)
  Matteo Viola (first round)
  Lucas Pouille (quarterfinals)
  Rubén Ramírez Hidalgo (first round)

Draw

Finals

Top half

Bottom half

References
 Main Draw
 Qualifying Draw

Morocco - Kenitra - Singles
2014 Singles
Kenitra - Singles